Duško Adamović (born 27 April 1973) is a retired Serbian footballer.

Adamović made his debut in the 2. Bundesliga for Tennis Borussia Berlin against FC St. Pauli on 4 March 1999.

References

External links 
 

1973 births
Living people
Serbian footballers
Association football midfielders
2. Bundesliga players
Tennis Borussia Berlin players